is a Japanese language daily newspaper. The company is associated with the Shizuoka Broadcasting System (SBS) group.

The first color edition was printed in 1961. From May 10, 1964, the Sunday and holiday evening editions were discontinued. From April 2011, the Saturday evening edition was discontinued.

External links
Shizuoka Shimbun (Japanese)
ShizuokaOnline.com (Japanese)

1941 establishments in Japan
Publications established in 1941
Japanese-language newspapers
Daily newspapers published in Japan
Mass media in Shizuoka (city)